Budila is a commune in Brașov County, Transylvania, Romania. It is composed of a single village, Budila.

Geography
It lies on the southern bank of the river Tărlung; the rivers Zizin and Seaca flow into the Tărlung in Budila.

Demographics
At the 2011 census, 77.2% of inhabitants were Romanians, 16.5% Hungarians, and 6.1% Roma. At the 2002 census, 68.2% were Romanian Orthodox, 18.3% Reformed, 7.6% Pentecostal and 3.6% Roman Catholic.

Castles
 ,
 
 
 Nemes Castle

References

Communes in Brașov County
Localities in Transylvania